Thundering Frontier is a 1940 American Western film directed by D. Ross Lederman and starring Charles Starrett.

Cast
 Charles Starrett as Jim Filmore
 Iris Meredith as Norma Belknap
 Ray Bennett as Ed Filmore (as Raphael Bennett)
 Alex Callam as Square Deal Scottie
 Carl Stockdale as Andrew Belknap
 Fred Burns as Hank Loomis
 Bob Nolan as Bob
 John Tyrrell as Bartender Mac
 Francis Walker as Henchman Stub
 John Dilson as Carter Filmore

References

External links
 

1940 films
1940 Western (genre) films
American Western (genre) films
American black-and-white films
1940s English-language films
Films directed by D. Ross Lederman
Columbia Pictures films
1940s American films